Brixton is a London Underground station on Brixton Road in Brixton in the London Borough of Lambeth, South London. The station is the southern terminus of the Victoria line. The station is known to have the largest London Underground roundel on the network. The next station is Stockwell.

History
The City and Brixton Railway had planned to link Brixton with Central London by underground railway in 1897 but was unable to raise funds for construction.

Brixton station on the Victoria line was opened on 23 July 1971 by the London Transport Executive. It has high usage for an inner suburban station with 33.46 million entries and exits during 2016 making it the 19th busiest station by this measure.

Design
From the ticket hall, three escalators take passengers to and from the platforms. There are also passenger lifts between street level, the ticket hall and the platforms to provide step free access.

The station is laid out as a two-track terminus with a scissors crossover north of the station, and the line continues for a short distance south of the station platforms to form a pair of sidings.

Station improvements
As part of a framework agreement with London Underground, Chetwoods were engaged to carry out an extensive refurbishment of the passenger areas of Brixton Underground Station. This included an overall redesign of the station's external façade and entrance lobby, together with refurbishment of a number of smaller retail outlets and the ticket office. The scheme developed the Practice's expertise in the particular technical and design requirements of underground facilities, benefitting the design approach to projects for other clients such as Network Rail. The refurbishment started in 2001, and was completed in 2010. The station was briefly closed for asbestos removal in 2006. The refurbishment works were a long drawn out process. New panels and lighting have been installed in the escalator shaft.

Location
The station is in Brixton Road and is about 100 m from Brixton railway station (on the London Victoria to Orpington line, operated by South Eastern). Although the route of the London Overground South London line also runs close to Brixton tube station, there is no station in Brixton on this route because it passes overhead on high railway arches.

Services and connections
Train frequencies vary throughout the day, but generally every 3–5 minutes between 05:55 and 00:18.

London Bus routes 2, 3, 35, 37, 45, 59, 109, 118, 133, 159, 196, 250, 333, 355, 415, 432, P4 and P5, and night routes N2, N3, N35, N109 and N133 serve the station.

Gallery

References

External links
Brixton tube station at urban75.org

Victoria line stations
London Underground Night Tube stations
Tube stations in the London Borough of Lambeth
Railway stations in Great Britain opened in 1971
Tube station